Zhang Daqing (born October 23, 1969) is a Chinese amateur astronomer. He is from Henan province.

He co-discovered periodic comet 153P/Ikeya-Zhang. He is the first Chinese amateur astronomer who has a comet name after him. He is also a telescope maker. Periodic comet 153P/Ikeya-Zhang is discovered by his self-made telescope on Feb.1st 2002.

External links
 http://comet.lamost.org/comet/zhang.htm (in Chinese)

Discoverers of comets
1969 births
Living people
People from Kaifeng
Scientists from Henan
21st-century Chinese astronomers